In mathematics, specifically in number theory, the extremal orders of an arithmetic function are best possible bounds of the given arithmetic function. Specifically, if f(n) is an arithmetic function and m(n) is a non-decreasing function that is ultimately positive and

we say that m is a minimal order for f. Similarly if M(n) is a non-decreasing function that is ultimately positive and

we say that M is a maximal order for f. Here,  and  denote the limit inferior and limit superior, respectively.

The subject was first studied systematically by Ramanujan starting in 1915.

Examples

 For the sum-of-divisors function σ(n) we have the trivial result  because always σ(n) ≥ n and for primes σ(p) = p + 1. We also have  proved by Gronwall in 1913.
 For the Euler totient φ(n) we have the trivial result  because always φ(n) ≤ n and for primes φ(p) = p − 1. We also have  proven by Landau in 1903.
 For the number of divisors function d(n) we have the trivial lower bound 2 ≤ d(n), in which equality occurs when n is prime, so 2 is a minimal order. For ln d(n) we have a maximal order , proved by Wigert in 1907.
 For the number of distinct prime factors ω(n) we have a trivial lower bound 1 ≤ ω(n), in which equality occurs when n is a prime power.
 For the number of prime factors counted with multiplicity Ω(n) we have a trivial lower bound 1 ≤ Ω(n), in which equality occurs when n is prime. A maximal order for Ω(n) is 
 It is conjectured that the Mertens function, or summatory function of the Möbius function, satisfies  though to date this limit superior has only been shown to be larger than a small constant. This statement is compared with the disproof of Mertens conjecture given by Odlyzko and te Riele in their several decades old breakthrough paper Disproof of the Mertens Conjecture. In contrast, we note that while extensive computational evidence suggests that the above conjecture is true, i.e., along some increasing sequence of  tending to infinity the average order of  grows unbounded, that the Riemann hypothesis is equivalent to the limit  being true for all (sufficiently small) .

See also

 Average order of an arithmetic function
 Normal order of an arithmetic function

Notes

Further reading
  A survey of extremal orders, with an extensive bibliography.

Arithmetic functions